John Hill House is a historic home located in Erie, Erie County, Pennsylvania.  The original section was built about 1836, with the south and east wings added during the 1850s. A two-story brick coach house and servants quarters was added to the property after 1891, and the original house connected to the main dwelling with the expansion of the rear ell.  The main dwelling is in a transitional Greek Revival / Italian Villa "picturesque" style. It features round-headed and hooded windows, prominent brackets, balconies, porches, and window bays.  It is faced with scored poured concrete and clapboard and topped with a gable roof.

It was added to the National Register of Historic Places in 1979.  It is located in the West Sixth Street Historic District.

References

Houses on the National Register of Historic Places in Pennsylvania
Greek Revival houses in Pennsylvania
Italianate architecture in Pennsylvania
Houses in Erie, Pennsylvania
National Register of Historic Places in Erie County, Pennsylvania